Philip McNeely is a politician in Ontario, Canada. He was a member of the Legislative Assembly of Ontario, representing the riding of Ottawa—Orléans for the Ontario Liberal Party.

Background
McNeely was born in Cumberland, Ontario and is bilingual. He was educated at Lisgar Collegiate and McGill University, earning a Bachelor of Engineering degree from the latter. He later earned the equivalent of a Master's Degree in engineering from the Imperial College of Science, Technology and Medicine in London. Before entering politics, he was the CEO of McNeely Engineering, a firm which operated in the Ottawa region. He sold this firm in 1997, claiming it had suffered under provincial cutbacks to infrastructure spending.

Municipal politics
In 2000, McNeely was elected as a municipal councillor for the Cumberland Ward of the amalgamated City of Ottawa, defeating incumbent Robert van den Ham.  In 2002, he played a key role in the successful Hay West project, in which hay from eastern Canada was shipped to the drought-stricken west.  He was also active in opposing the creation of a hog farm in the village of Sarsfield part of the Cumberland Ward of Ottawa.

Provincial politics
In the provincial election of 2003, he defeated incumbent Progressive Conservative Brian Coburn in Ottawa—Orleans by about 4500 votes.  He was named a government whip on October 23, 2003.

In July 2006, McNeely described Israel as a "rogue state", arguing that Israel's military campaign in Lebanon was resulting in collective punishment for the Lebanese people. Dalton McGuinty expressed "serious dismay and disappointment" for these remarks, and McNeely later offered an apology for the language of his comments.

He was re-elected to the provincial legislature in 2007, beating Conservative candidate Graham Fox by almost 9,000 votes. In the 2011 election he was re-elected with a margin of 2,854 votes.

In 2005, McNeely proposed an amendment to a no smoking bill that would ban power wall cigarette advertising from convenience stores and retail businesses. The "McNeely Amendment", which came into effect on May 31, 2008, has helped keep cigarettes out of the sight of children.

During his time in office, McNeely has served as Parliamentary Assistant to a number of ministers including Minister of Transportation, Minister of Health and Long Term Care and most recently as PA to the Minister of the Environment.

In 2014, McNeely announced that he would not seek re-election in the 2014 contest.

Electoral record

References

External links

1932 births
Alumni of Imperial College London
Living people
McGill University Faculty of Engineering alumni
Ontario Liberal Party MPPs
Ottawa city councillors
21st-century Canadian politicians